Hulett is a surname. Notable people with the surname include:

Alistair Hulett (1951–2010), Scottish singer and socialist
Alta M. Hulett (1854–1877), American lawyer
DeeAndre Hulett (born 1980), American basketball player
Liege Hulett (1838–1928), South African businessman
Otto Hulett (1898–1983), American actor
Tim Hulett (born 1960), American baseball player
Tug Hulett (born 1983), American baseball player